His House in Order is a 1920 American silent drama film produced by Famous Players-Lasky and distributed by Paramount Pictures. It was directed by Hugh Ford and starred Elsie Ferguson. It is based on a 1906 West End play by Sir Arthur Wing Pinero which also played in New York where it starred John Drew and Margaret Illington. The story was filmed again in the United Kingdom in 1928 and also titled House in Order.

Plot
As described in a film magazine, young impulsive Englishwoman Nina Graham (Ferguson), left penniless by the death of her father, takes a position as governess in the home of Filmer Jesson (Herbert), M.P. Filmer's wife Annabelle (Steele) is killed in an accident, and Nina learns that Annabelle had been carrying on an affair with an army officer. Later Nina and Filmer marry, but she is harassed by his constant references to his departed wife. His discovery that Annabelle was not the paragon he thought she was unnerves him and he seeks solace in the love of Nina.

Cast
Elsie Ferguson as Nina Graham
Holmes Herbert as Filmer Jesson
Vernon Steele as Hillary Jesson
Margaret Linden as Annabelle Jesson
Marie Burke as Geraldine Ridgley
Lawrence Johnson as Derek Jesson
William P. Carleton as undetermined role
Forrest Robinson as undetermined
Jane Jennings as undetermined
Lewis Sealy as undetermined
Regis Collins as undetermined
Inez Borrero as undetermined

Preservation status
Both the 1920 American and the 1928 British film are now considered to be lost films.

See also
Bonds of Love (1919) based on the same Pinero story

References

External links

 

Still of a scene from His House in Order (University of Washington, Sayre collection)

1920 films
American silent feature films
American films based on plays
Films directed by Hugh Ford
Lost American films
Silent American drama films
1920 drama films
Famous Players-Lasky films
American black-and-white films
1920 lost films
Lost drama films
1920s American films